Lamar Perkins (1896–?) was a state legislator in New York.

He was born in Georgia. He represented Harlem. He was a Republican. His photograph appeared in The Crisis along with other "Black Rulers".

References

1896 births
African-American state legislators in New York (state)
Republican Party members of the New York State Assembly
Year of death missing
African-American men in politics